The Face of Anonymous is a Canadian documentary television film, directed by Gary Lang and released in 2021. The film is a portrait of Christopher "Commander X" Doyon, a senior figure in the computer hacktivist collective Anonymous who spent several years living on the streets of Toronto as a homeless person after fleeing the United States due to criminal prosecution.

The film premiered at the Hot Docs Canadian International Documentary Festival on April 29, 2021, in advance of its television broadcast on May 25 on TVOntario. A few weeks after the film's broadcast, Doyon was extradited from Mexico, where he was residing at the time, back to the United States to face prosecution.

The film was a Canadian Screen Award nominee for Best Documentary Program at the 10th Canadian Screen Awards in 2022.

References

External links
 

2021 films
2021 documentary films
Canadian documentary television films
Documentary films about cyberwarfare
TVO original programming
2020s Canadian films